The Tapanee Levitation 2 is a Canadian STOL amateur-built aircraft, designed and produced by Tapanee Aviation of Mont-Saint-Michel, Quebec. The aircraft is supplied as a kit for amateur construction.

The Levitation 2 was offered for sale in 2011, but as of 2012 the company no longer advertises that it is available.

Design and development
The aircraft is a two-seat development of the four-seat Tapanee Levitation 4.

The Levitation 2 is made from welded steel tubing and aluminum, with its flying surfaces covered with doped aircraft fabric. The wing is supported by "V" struts and jury struts. Construction time from the supplied kit is estimated as 1750 hours.

Operational history
In 2007 a single example was registered with Transport Canada and in December 2011 the company reported one aircraft had been completed.

Specifications (Levitation 2)

References

External links
Photo of the sole Tapanee Levitation 2

Homebuilt aircraft
Single-engined tractor aircraft
Tapanee Aviation aircraft